Manu Omar Platt (born 1980) is an American biomedical engineer who is a professor at the Georgia Institute of Technology Wallace H. Coulter Department of Biomedical Engineering. He serves as Diversity Director of the Center on Emergent Behaviors of Integrated Cellular Systems.

Early life and education 
Platt is the son of a veteran of the United States Air Force. He spent his high school years in Dover, Delaware. As a high school student, Platt took part in science enrichment programmes at Delaware State University. He earned his undergraduate degree at Morehouse College, where he studied biology as an ARCS Foundation scholar. At Morehouse, Platt was mentored by Robert M. Nerem, and he took part in the Morehouse SPACE scholar programme. On Nerem's advice Platt moved to the Georgia Institute of Technology for his graduate studies, where he worked with Hanjoong Jo on endothelial cell biology. His doctoral research was performed in collaboration with Emory University School of Medicine, as one of the first students to be part of the newly established biomedical engineering program. After earning his doctoral degree he joined Massachusetts Institute of Technology (MIT).

Research and career 
In 2009 Platt was appointed to the faculty of the Coulter Department of Biomedical Engineering at Georgia Tech, where he investigates the proteolytic mechanisms of disease, with a focus on conditions that impact Black communities. He has concentrated on reducing the occurrence of stroke in patients with sickle cell disease.

Platt has investigated how scientific discoveries have impacted the governmental response to HIV/AIDS. He studied the various bills introduced by the United States Congress, and found that whilst the number of bills was related to breakthroughs in scientific research, it did not impact the passage of laws.

Platt is the founding director of Engaging New Generations at Georgia Tech through Engineering and Science (ENGAGES), a biotechnology and engineering research scheme for African American high school students. He delivered the 2017 Biomedical Engineering Society lecture, where he spoke about being from an underrepresented group in science, “Often, if you are the first or the only of a particular demographic category, the path is neither well paved, nor well lit,”. He remarked that scientists can feel like they are waiting for the “perfect time,” to be impactful in promoting diversity and inclusion. In 2019 he was selected as a Keystone Symposia Fellow. In response to the George Floyd protests, universities released statements that called out racism within their research institutions. Platt wrote a perspective piece for Nature Reviews Materials on racism within academia, in which he wrote, “It is said that science is a meritocracy; however, that only holds true if Black professors’ existence is accepted,”.

Presentations 
"Danger of Waiting for 'Perfect Time' to Promote Diversity and Inclusion." Lecture presented to the University of Arkansas, Biomedical Engineering Seminar, September 13, 2018.

Awards and honours 

 NIH/International AIDS Society Scholarship
 National Institutes of Health Director's New Innovator Award
 Georgia Tech Biomedical Engineering Society Diversity Award
 Georgia Distinguished Cancer Scientist Award
 Emerging Scholar, Diverse: Issues in Higher Education magazine

Selected publications

Personal life 
Platt is one of six sons, including political science researcher Matthew B. Platt. He is a master of origami.

References 

American biomedical engineers
1980 births
Living people
Georgia Tech alumni
Massachusetts Institute of Technology faculty
Georgia Tech faculty
African-American engineers
21st-century African-American people
20th-century African-American people